Dallas County is a county located in the U.S. state of Iowa. As of the 2020 Census, the population was 99,678, making it the seventh-most populous county in Iowa. Between 2010 and 2020, it was the fastest growing county in Iowa and one of the fastest growing in the country. Its county seat is Adel, and its largest city is Waukee. The county was named for George M. Dallas, Vice President of the United States under James K. Polk, the namesake of neighboring Polk County.

Dallas County is included in the Des Moines–West Des Moines, IA Metropolitan Statistical Area.

History
The land that now forms Dallas County was ceded by the Sac and Fox nation to the United States in a treaty signed on October 11, 1842.

On January 13, 1846, the legislative body of the Iowa Territory authorized the creation of twelve counties in the Iowa Territory, with general descriptions of their boundaries. Dallas County's name referred to United States Vice President George M. Dallas, who served from 1845 to 1849.

In 1847 the county residents voted to designate Penoch as the county seat (the name was changed to Adel in 1849). The county's population grew rapidly, with settlers coming to claim homesteads. By 1870, the population had crossed the 12,000 mark.

Geography

Major highways
 Interstate 80 – runs east-northeast across the southern portion of the county, passing Dexter and De Soto on its way to Des Moines
 U.S. Highway 6 – from its starting point in Adel, runs east across the midsection of the county on its way to Des Moines
 U.S. Highway 169 – runs north–south through the center of the county, from Bouton to Adel to De Soto
 Iowa Highway 17 – from its starting point (intersection with Iowa 141) at Granger, runs north along the county's eastern boundary, into Boone County
 Iowa Highway 44 – runs east–west through the center of the county, through Dallas Center
 Iowa Highway 141 – runs east across northern portion of county, through Dawson, Perry, Bouton and Woodward, then southeast to exit into Polk County at Granger
 Iowa Highway 144 - from its starting point (intersection w Iowa 141) at Perry, runs north into Boone County
 Iowa Highway 210 – from its starting point (intersection w Iowa 141), runs north to Woodward and continues into Boone County

Adjacent counties
Adair County – southwest
Boone County – north
Greene County – north and northwest
Guthrie County – west
Madison County – south
Polk County – east
Warren County – southeast

Demographics

2020 census
There were 41,125 housing units of which 38,291 were occupied.

2010 census
There were 27,260 housing units, of which 25,240 were occupied.

2000 census

As of the census of 2000, there were 40,750 people, 15,584 households, and 11,173 families in the county. There were 16,529 housing units at an average density of 28 per square  mile (11/km2). The racial makeup of the county was 94.75% White, 0.74% Black or African American, 0.15% Native American, 0.69% Asian, 0.04% Pacific Islander, 2.79% from other races, and 0.84% from two or more races. 5.40% of the population were Hispanic or Latino of any race.

Of the 15,584 households, 37.20% had children under the age of 18 living with them, 60.60% were married couples living together, 8.00% had a female householder with no husband present, and 28.30% were non-families. 23.60% of households were one person and 8.20% were one person aged 65 or older. The average household size was 2.59 and the average family size was 3.08.

The age distribution was 28.20% under the age of 18, 6.90% from 18 to 24, 32.10% from 25 to 44, 21.60% from 45 to 64, and 11.10% 65 or older. The median age was 35 years. For every 100 females, there were 97.70 males. For every 100 females age 18 and over, there were 93.80 males.

The median household income was $48,528 and the median family income was $58,293. Males had a median income of $37,243 versus $27,026 for females. The per capita income for the county was $22,970. About 4.00% of families and 5.60% of the population were below the poverty line, including 6.10% of those under age 18 and 7.10% of those age 65 or over.

Communities

Cities

Adel
Bouton
Clive ‡
Dallas Center
Dawson
De Soto
Dexter
Granger‡
Grimes ‡
Linden
Minburn
Perry
Redfield
Urbandale ‡
Van Meter
Waukee
West Des Moines ‡
Woodward

‡ partly in Polk County

Unincorporated communities
Booneville

Townships

 Adams
 Adel
 Beaver
 Boone
 Colfax
 Dallas
 Des Moines
 Grant
 Lincoln
 Linn
 Spring Valley
 Sugar Grove
 Union
 Van Meter
 Walnut
 Washington

Population ranking
The population ranking of the following table is based on the 2020 census of Dallas County.

† county seat

Politics
Prior to 1932, Dallas County was strongly Republican in presidential elections. From 1932 to 1996, it was a swing county, having a Republican lean   until 1960 & a Democratic lean from 1964 to 1996, especially after 1980. Since 2000, it has been consistently Republican, though no Republican presidential candidate has won over 60% of the vote nor has a Democrat won less than 40% since then.

See also

National Register of Historic Places listings in Dallas County, Iowa
 Raccoon River Valley Trail

References

External links

Dallas County government's website 
HISTORY OF DALLAS COUNTY, IOWA 1879 Online book

 
1846 establishments in Iowa Territory
Des Moines metropolitan area
Populated places established in 1846